John Maurice Hardman Campbell  (1891–1973) was a British physician, cardiologist, and medical journal editor.

Biography
After education at Winchester College, J. Maurice Campbell studied at New College, Oxford, where he graduated with a first-class honours degree in physiology. He was awarded a senior demyship at Magdalen College, Oxford and entered in 1914 Guy's Hospital Medical School, where he graduated in 1916 BM BCh (Oxon.). He joined in 1916 the RAMC, served with the rank of captain in Mesopotamia and North Persia, and was twice mentioned in despatches. In June 1919 he was awarded the OBE for his services with a field ambulance.

In 1920 Campbell returned to Guy's Hospital as a medical registrar. He graduated DM in 1921 and qualified MRCP in 1921. He spent three years (from 1923 to 1925) in the department of physiology working with E. P. Poulton on oxygen therapy and with Marcus Pembrey. Campbell held from 1923 to 1927 a Beit memorial research fellowship, in 1925 resumed clinical work as a medical registrar, and in 1926 became an assistant physician at Guy's Hospital. He was elected FRCP in 1929.

At the National Heart Hospital he began working in 1926 with the cardiologist John Parkinson and in 1930 became there a consultant physician. During WWII Campbell was superintendent of the Emergency Medical Service Hospital, Orpington. At Guy's Hospital he was promoted in 1945 to general physician, and in 1948 became a cardiologist and head of the newly-founded cardiac department.

The Worshipful Company of Clothworkers sponsored a visitor exchange of senior staff members between Guy's Hospital and the Johns Hopkins Hospital. Under this sponsorship Campbell invited in 1947 Alfred Blalock to Guy's Hospital to perform the first "blue baby operation" in the UK. Campbell identified a number of patients with cyanotic heart disease as possible candidates for surgery.

Campbell delivered in 1946 the Lumleian Lectures. In 1958 he retired from active clinical practice but continued to write papers and attend medical conferences. He was president from 1956 to 1960 of the British Cardiac Society and was the chair of the British Heart Foundation upon its inception in 1961. The Royal College of Physicians award him the Moxon medal in 1966.

Campbell published in 1935 a book entitled Sherlock Holmes and Doctor Watson: A Medical Digression and was an active member of the Sherlock Holmes Society of London. In the autumn of 1972 he made a lecture tour of American medical centres.

J. Maurice Campbell's father was the mathematician John Edward Campbell. On 28 August 1924 in Nefyn, Caernarfonshire, Maurice Campbell married Ethel Mary Chrimes, a nurse at Guy's Hospital. He was survived by his widow, two sons and three daughters.

Selected publications

with Charles Baker and R. C. Brock: 
with D. Deuchar: 
with Ralph Kauntze: 

with D. C. Deuchar and Russel Brock: 
with D. C. Deuchar: 
with Charles Baker and Russell Brock: 
with Margaret Turner-Warwick: 
with Catherine Neill and S. Suzman: 
with L. Brotmacher: 

with P. E. Polani: 

with Richard Emanuel:

References

1891 births
1973 deaths
People educated at Winchester College
Alumni of New College, Oxford
20th-century English medical doctors
British cardiologists
Officers of the Order of the British Empire
Fellows of the Royal College of Physicians
Royal Army Medical Corps officers
20th-century British medical doctors